Twenty-Third Air Force (Air Forces Special Operations Forces) was a Numbered Air Force that was assigned to Air Force Special Operations Command. It was stationed at Hurlburt Field, Florida and was active from 1 January 2008 until 4 April 2013. It served as the operational headquarters for Air Force special operations forces assigned to joint and combined commands. Starting in 2012, it transferred operational control of some of its units to other headquarters; its remaining functions were assumed by the Air Force Special Operations Command Air Operations Center when it was inactivated the following year.

History
Before 1983, USAF special operations forces (SOF) were primarily assigned to Tactical Air Command (TAC) and were generally deployed under the control of U.S. Air Forces in Europe (USAFE) or, as had been the case during the Vietnam War, Pacific Air Forces (PACAF). Just as it had relinquished control of the C-130 theater airlift fleet to Military Airlift Command (MAC) in 1975, TAC relinquished control of Air Force SOF to MAC in December 1982.

Twenty-Third Air Force was established on 1 March 1983 at Scott AFB, Illinois, as an additional Numbered Air Force in MAC with responsibility for all Air Force SOF units, personnel, aircraft and installations as well as Aerospace Rescue and Recovery Service (ARRS) and weather reconnaissance units, personnel and aircraft that were already extant in MAC.  On 1 August 1987, Twenty-Third Air Force moved to Hurlburt Field, Florida.  Twenty-Third Air Force later served as the core organization for the formation of Air Force Special Operations Command (AFSOC).  Twenty-Third Air Force was inactivated on 22 May 1990 when AFSOC was established as an Air Force major command (MAJCOM).   

On 1 January 2008, Twenty-Third Air Force was reestablished at Hurlburt Field as Air Force Special Operations Command's only Numbered Air Force with responsibility for Air Force Special Operations Forces.  It was established as the headquarters to execute Air Force Special Operations Command missions supporting United States Special Operations Command.

The mission of Twenty-Third Air Force was to provide special operations forces to deployed air commanders.  Its mission was to monitor and control global special operations activity to senior leaders; providing trained special operations command and control, intelligence, and weather support elements to theater special operations commanders and executing command and control for air, space and cyberspace operations supporting United States Special Operations Command.

Its 623rd Air and Space Operations Center included personnel and equipment to form joint special operations air components, responsible for planning and executing joint special operations air activities. and integrating special operations with conventional air operations.  The 23rd Weather Squadron provided global weather coverage for Joint, Army, and Air Force special operations missions. The 11th Intelligence Squadron created intelligence products tailored for special operations missions. Finally, the 18th Flight Test Squadron evaluated aircraft, equipment, and tactics to assess their mission capability.

Upon its inactivation its mission was transferred to its subordinate 623rd Air Operations Center, which was reassigned to Air Force Special Operations Command and renamed the Air Force Special Operations Command Operations Center.

Lineage
 Established as Twenty-Third Air Force
 Activated on 1 March 1983
 Inactivated on 22 May 1990
 Reestablished as Twenty-Third Air Force (Air Force Special Operations Forces) on 30 November 2007
 Activated on 1 January 2008
 Inactivated on 4 April 2013

Assignments
 Air Force Special Operations Command, 1 January 2008 –  4 April 2013

Components
 623rd Air and Space Operations Center (later 623rd Air Operations Center), 1 January 2008 –  4 April 2013
 23rd Weather Squadron, 1 January 2008 –  28 March 2013 (attached to 1st Special Operations Group after 31 July 2012)
 11th Intelligence Squadron, 1 January 2008 –  31 July 2012
 18th Flight Test Squadron, 1 January 2008 –  12 February 2013

Stations
 Hurlburt Field, Florida, 1 January 2008 – 4 April 2013

List of commanders 

 Brig Gen Michael W. Callan, 1 January 2008
 Brig Gen Thomas J. Trask, 14 July 2008
 Brig Gen Richard S. Haddad, 7 January 2009
 Col Marshall B. Webb, 3 April 2009
 Col Thomas Trask, 3 April 2009

References

Bibliography

External links
 Heritage of the Special Operations Professionals

23
Military units and formations in Florida
Military units and formations established in 2007